Collinsville Community Unit School District 10 is a school district in Illinois.  It is made up of nine elementary schools, one intermediate school, one middle school, one high school, one vocational school, and serves the towns of Collinsville, Caseyville, Fairmont City and Maryville.

It is governed by a 7-member school board.

Schools
 Caseyville Elementary School
 Collinsville Area Vocational Center
 Collinsville High School
 Dorris Intermediate School
 Collinsville Middle School
 Hollywood Heights Elementary School
 Jefferson Elementary School
 Kreitner Elementary School
 Maryville Elementary School
 Renfro Elementary School
 Summit Elementary School
 Twin Echo Elementary School
 Webster Elementary School

See also
 List of school districts in Illinois

External links
 Collinsville Community Unit School District 10

School districts in Illinois
Education in Madison County, Illinois